Arthur George Bernier (July 16, 1886 – May 21, 1953) was a professional ice hockey player for the Montreal Canadiens, Montreal Wanderers and Galt Professionals. He played for the Canadiens in their inaugural season of 1909–10. He was born in Kingston, Ontario.

Playing career
Art played intermediate hockey for Belleville in the Ontario Hockey Association in the 1903–04 season. He joined the Canadian army in 1904 and played hockey for the Kingston 14th Regiment in Senior OHA play for three seasons from 1906–1909. He joined the Montreal Canadiens in the team's inaugural 1910 season and played the full 12 game season. He was among the scorers in the Canadiens first-ever game, a 7-6 win against Cobalt in which his mother was hurt in the stands by a stick due to the lack of protective coverage for the viewers in attendance.

He played 3 games for the Galt Professionals after the NHA season was finished. He returned to the Canadiens for the 1910–11 and only played in 3 games. The next season, he joined the Wanderers and played in 10 games, scoring 4 goals.

References

External links

1886 births
1953 deaths
Ice hockey people from Ontario
Montreal Canadiens (NHA) players
Montreal Wanderers (NHA) players
Sportspeople from Kingston, Ontario
Canadian ice hockey centres